Robin Norell (born February 18, 1995) is a Swedish professional ice hockey defenceman. He is currently playing with the IK Oskarshamn of the Swedish Hockey League (SHL). Norell was selected by the Chicago Blackhawks in the fourth round (111th overall) of the 2013 NHL Entry Draft.

Playing career
Norell began playing hockey in Huddinge IK and later moved to Djurgårdens IF to play in the junior organization of the club. Norell signed his first professional contract, a two year deal with Djurgården, for the 2013–14 season. He extended his contract with Djurgården for another season in May 2015. At the completion of the 2015–16 season in the SHL, Norell left Djurgården and signed a three-year entry-level contract with the Chicago Blackhawks on March 31, 2016.

Approaching the final year of his entry-level deal with the Blackhawks having made a limited impact with American Hockey League affiliate, the Rockford IceHogs, Norell opted to return to his native Sweden and re-join Djurgårdens IF on loan for the 2018–19 season on August 23, 2018. During the mid-point of the season, he agreed to a two-year contract extension to remain with Djurgården through 2021 on December 17, 2018. Norell's NHL contract was included in a trade by the Blackhawks, along with Brandon Manning, to the Edmonton Oilers in exchange for Drake Caggiula and Jason Garrison on December 30, 2018.

Following the conclusion of his contract with Djurgården, Norell as a free agent continued in the SHL, agreeing to a two-year contract with IK Oskarshamn, on 28 April 2021.

Career statistics

Regular season and playoffs

International

References

External links

1995 births
Living people
Chicago Blackhawks draft picks
Djurgårdens IF Hockey players
IK Oskarshamn players
Rockford IceHogs (AHL) players
Ice hockey people from Stockholm
Swedish ice hockey defencemen